Nangli Godha is a village in Rewari tehsil of Rewari in the Indian state of Haryana.

There is a craze in young generation of this village to serve in Indian Armed forces as it is a trend that almost each house of the village had someone serving or served in Indian armed forces.

The village is well developed with good infrastructure of roads, underlying water pipelines to every house and also underlying sewage pipelines. It also has a water purifier RO which feeds the whole village.

There is also a private school named saraswati school in this village which imparts advanced and English medium education. People live in harmony with each other.

Location 
Nangli Godha is situated at a distance of 8 km from Rewari in the south- west direction on State highway- 15. It is 3km from kanuka more which is on rewari - narnaul road. Nearby villages are thothwal, rajiyaki, goliyaki , bhandor, bharawas and daliyaki.

It is at a distance of about 1.5 km from New rewari junction which is a new junction on fright corridor.

History 
The village was founded by two Yadav brothers of Gogar Naresh Gotra. The elder brother was Godhaji Yadav after whom the village was named Godhaji ki Nangli. Over the years the name morphed into Nangli Godha.
The village led Ahirwal into serving the nation with each house being proud of at least one soldier and/or officer in the Indian Armed Forces.

Occupation 
Main occupation of people is agriculture and government/private jobs. Some villagers are employed in government services and many people are doing private jobs in other states and countries.

Transport 
Nangli Godha is connected to nearby villages through the road network with presence of State Transport Service and Private Bus Services which link it to Rewari and other villages.

Demographics 
 India Census, Nangli Godha had a population of 1080. Male population was 551, while female population was 529.

As of 2011 India census, Nangli Godha had a population of 1666 in 217 households. Males (864) constitute 51.86% of the population and females (802) 48.13%. Nangli Godha has an average literacy (1266) rate of 75.99%, more than the national average of 74%: male literacy (730) is 57.66%, and female literacy (536) is 42.33% of total literates. In Nangli Godha, 11.70% of the population is under 6 years of age (195).

References 

Villages in Rewari district